Luigi Sculli (born 12 September 1921 in Omegna -1959) was an Italian professional football player.

1921 births
1959 deaths
People from Omegna
Italian footballers
Serie A players
Inter Milan players
Association football goalkeepers
Vigevano Calcio players
A.S.D. AVC Vogherese 1919 players
Footballers from Piedmont
Sportspeople from the Province of Verbano-Cusio-Ossola